The 2022 Aberto da República was a professional tennis tournament played on outdoor clay courts. It was the second edition of the tournament which was part of the 2022 ITF Women's World Tennis Tour. It took place in Rio de Janeiro, Brazil between 28 November and 4 December 2022.

Champions

Singles

  Iryna Shymanovich def.  Irina Khromacheva, 6–2, 5–7, 6–4

Doubles

  Ingrid Gamarra Martins /  Francisca Jorge def.  Anna Rogers /  Christina Rosca, 6–4, 6–3

Singles main draw entrants

Seeds

 1 Rankings are as of 21 November 2022.

Other entrants
The following players received wildcards into the singles main draw:
  Ana Candiotto
  Gabriela Felix da Silva
  Maria Carolina Ferreira Turchetto
  Paola Ueno Dalmonico

The following players received entry from the qualifying draw:
  Bianca Bernardes
  Cecilia Costa
  Maria Luisa Oliveira
  Rebeca Pereira
  Luana Plaza Araújo
  Francesca Maguiña Bunikowska
  Anna Rogers
  Christina Rosca

References

External links
 2022 Aberto da República at ITFtennis.com

2022 ITF Women's World Tennis Tour
2022 in Brazilian tennis
November 2022 sports events in Brazil
December 2022 sports events in Brazil